Tabaco National High School is a public secondary school that was founded in 1945. It is located in barangay Panal, Tabaco City, Albay.

History
It was founded in 1945, right after the liberation period when competition courses where then in order. Because of the ravages of war, the Albay High School under the principalship of Mr. Benigno Reyes was temporarily transferred to Tabaco at the Qua Chee Gan Building, but graduation exercises that year were held in Albay.

When classes opened the following year, there was a move to return the Albay High School to Legazpi, but prominent citizens of the province opposed the movement. Spearheaded by Congressman Casimiro Binamira, the former Governor Saturnino Benito, the late Atty. Simplicio B. Peña, and local and provincial leaders worked for the retention of the high school in Tabaco.

They succeeded and Mr. Pastor Escalante was appointed principal of that Albay High School in Tabaco. However, due to the problem of the buildings, school necessities and other things, classes were shifted from Qua Chee Gan to Golinco and later to Poblete Buildings with students furnishing the school necessities such as chairs and tables. That school year was remarkable, for the first High School day was celebrated with Marichu Crisol reigning as Miss Tabaco High School.

There was a later plan to move Tabaco Albay High School to its former site, but this was successfully resisted by local people. The Parent–teacher association raised funds for a permanent school site.

References

Educational institutions established in 1945
High schools in the Philippines
1945 establishments in the Philippines
Schools in Albay